"What to the Slave Is the Fourth of July?" was a speech delivered by Frederick Douglass on July 5, 1852, at Corinthian Hall in Rochester, New York, at a meeting organized by the Rochester Ladies' Anti-Slavery Society. In the address, Douglass states that positive statements about American values, such as liberty, citizenship, and freedom, were an offense to the enslaved population of the United States because they lacked those rights. Douglass referred not only to the captivity of enslaved people, but to the merciless exploitation and the cruelty and torture that slaves were subjected to in the United States. 

Noted for its biting irony and bitter rhetoric, and acute textual analysis of the U.S. Constitution, the Declaration of Independence, and the Christian Bible, the speech is among the most widely known of all of Douglass's writings. Many copies of one section of it, beginning in paragraph 32, have been circulated online. Due to this and the variant titles given to it in various places, and the fact that it is called a July Fourth Oration but was actually delivered on July 5, some confusion has arisen about the date and contents of the speech. The speech has since been published under the above title in The Frederick Douglass Papers, Series One, Vol. 2. (1982).

Background 

The Rochester Ladies' Anti-Slavery Society was founded in 1851. The inaugural meeting between six women took place in Corinthian Hall on August 20. Frederick Douglass had moved to Rochester in 1847 in order to publish his newspaper The North Star. He had previously lived in Boston, but did not want his newspaper to interfere with sales of The Liberator, published by William Lloyd Garrison. Douglass had spoken at Corinthian Hall in the past. He had delivered a series of seven lectures about slavery there in the winter of 1850–51. Additionally, he had spoken there less than three months prior to this speech, on March 25. In that speech, he cast the abolitionist movement as being engaged in a "War" against defenders of slavery.

According to the 1850 Census, there were around 3.2 million enslaved persons in the United States. Although the import of people directly from Africa had been banned in 1807, the domestic slave trade, still legal, was thriving. Over 150,000 persons were sold between 1820 and 1830, and over 300,000 were sold between 1850 and 1860. 

In 1850, the Fugitive Slave Act had passed Congress as part of the broader Compromise of 1850. This act forced citizens to report people who had escaped their enslavement and escaped to a free state, under punishment of a fine or imprisonment. Additionally, it awarded $10 to a judge who sentenced an individual to return to enslavement, while awarding only $5 if the claim was dismissed. Finally, the Act did not allow the accused individual of defending themselves in court. This act drew the ire of the abolitionist movement, and was directly criticized by Douglass in his speech.

Speech 

Douglass begins by saying that the fathers of the nation were great statesmen, and that the values expressed in the Declaration of Independence were "saving principles", and the "ringbolt of your nation's destiny", stating, "stand by those principles, be true to them on all occasions, in all places, against all foes, and at whatever cost." Douglass details the hardships past Americans once endured when they were members of British colonies and validates their feelings of ill treatment. He celebrates the efforts of the founding fathers of America for fighting back against the tyranny of England.

Douglass then pivots to the present, stating that "We have to do with the past only as we can make it useful to the present and to the future". In spite of his praise of the Founding Fathers, he maintains that slaves owe nothing to and have no positive feelings towards the founding of the United States. He faults America for utter hypocrisy and betrayal of those values in maintaining the institution of slavery.

Douglass also stresses the view that slaves and free Americans are equal in nature. He expresses his belief in the speech that he and other slaves are fighting the same fight in terms of wishing to be free that White Americans, the ancestors of the white people he is addressing, fought seventy years earlier. Douglass says that if the residents of America believe that slaves are "men", they should be treated as such. 

Douglass then discusses the internal slave trade in America. He argues that though the international slave trade is correctly decried as abhorrent, the people of the United States are far less vocal in their opposition to domestic slave trade. Douglass vividly describes the conditions under which those enslaved are bought and sold; he says that they are treated as no more than animals.

Building off of this, Douglass criticizes the Fugitive Slave Act, holding that in this act, "slavery has been nationalized in its most horrible and revolting form." He describes the legislation as "tyrannical," and believes that it is in "violation of justice."

After this, he turns his attention to the church. True Christians, according to Douglass, should not stand idly by while the rights and liberty of others are stripped away. Douglass denounces the churches for betraying their own biblical and Christian values. He is outraged by the lack of responsibility and indifference towards slavery that many sects have taken around the nation. He says that, if anything, many churches actually stand behind slavery and support the continued existence of the institution. Douglass equates this to being worse than many other things that are banned, in particular, books and plays that are banned for infidelity.

Douglass believed that slavery could be eliminated with the support of the church, and also with the reexamination of what the Bible was actually saying.

Nevertheless, Douglass claims that this can change. The United States does not have to stay the way it is. The country can progress like it has before, transforming from being a colony of a far-away king to an independent nation. Great Britain, and many other countries of that time, had already abolished slavery from its territories. The British accomplished this through religion or more specifically, the church. Because the church stood behind the decision to abolish the selling and buying of people, so did the rest of the country. Douglass argues that religion is the center of the problem but also the main solution to it.

Douglass then returns to the topic of the founding of the United States. He argues that the Constitution does not permit slavery, contrary to the claims of contemporary defenders of the institution. He refers to the Constitution as a "Glorious Liberty Document".

Analysis

A major theme of the speech is how America is not living up to its proclaimed beliefs. He talks about how Americans are proud of their country and their religion and how they rejoice in the name of freedom and liberty and yet they do not offer those things to millions of their country's residents.He also attempts to demonstrate the irony of their inability to sympathize with the Black people they oppressed in cruel ways that the forefathers they valorized never experienced. He validates the feelings of injustice the Founders felt then juxtaposes their experiences with vivid descriptions of the harshness of slavery.

However, if slavery were abolished and equal rights given to all, that would no longer be the case. In the end, Douglass wants to keep his hope and faith in humanity high. Douglass declares that true freedom can not exist in America if Black people are still enslaved there and is adamant that the end of slavery is near. Knowledge is becoming more readily available, Douglass said, and soon the American people will open their eyes to the atrocities they have been inflicting on their fellow Americans.

Essentially, Douglass criticizes his audience's pride for a nation that claims to value freedom though it is composed of people who continuously commit atrocities against Blacks. It is said that America is built on the idea of liberty and freedom, but Douglass tells his audience that more than anything, it is built on inconsistencies and hypocrisies that have been overlooked for so long they appear to be truths. According to Douglass, these inconsistencies have made the United States the object of mockery and often contempt among the various nations of the world. To prove evidence of these inconsistencies, as one historian noted, during the speech Douglass claims that the United States Constitution is an abolitionist document and not a pro-slavery document.

In this respect, Douglass's views converged with that of Abraham Lincoln's in that those politicians who were saying that the Constitution was a justification for their beliefs in regard to slavery were doing so dishonestly.

The speech notes the contradiction of the national ethos of United States and the way enslaved persons are treated. Rhetoricians R. L. Heath and D. Waymer refer to this as the "paradox of the positive" because it highlights how something positive and meant to be positive can also exclude individuals.

Later views on American independence
The speech "What to the Slave Is the Fourth of July?" was delivered in the decade preceding the American Civil War, which lasted from 1861 to 1865 and achieved the abolition of slavery. During the Civil War, Douglass said that since Massachusetts had been the first state to join the Patriot cause during the American Revolutionary War, black men should go to Massachusetts to enlist in the Union Army. After the Civil War, Douglass said that "we" had achieved a great thing by gaining American independence during the American Revolutionary War, though he said it was not as great as what was achieved by the Civil War.

Legacy

In the United States, the speech is widely taught in history and English classes in high school and college. American studies professor Andrew S. Bibby argues that because many of the editions produced for educational use are abridged, they often misrepresent Douglass's original through omission or editorial focus.

A statue of Douglass erected in Rochester in 2018 was torn down on July 5, 2020—the 168th anniversary of the speech. The head of the organization responsible for the memorial speculated that it was vandalized in response to the removal of Confederate monuments in the wake of the George Floyd protests.

Notable readings
The speech has been notably performed or read by important figures, including the following: 
James Earl Jones
Morgan Freeman
Danny Glover
Ossie Davis
Baratunde Thurston
Five of Douglass's descendants

References

Further reading 

 Douglass, Frederick. A Narrative of the Life of Frederick Douglass, an American Slave. New York: Dover Publications, Inc. 1845.
 Douglass, Frederick, ed. Stauffer, John. Random House. 2003. My Bondage and My Freedom: Part I - Life as a Slave, Part II - Life as a Freeman, with an introduction by James McCune Smith. New York: Miller, Orton & Mulligan. 1855.
 Gates, Jr. Henry Louis, ed. Frederick Douglass, Autobiography. New York: Library of America. 1994.
 Oakes, James. The Radical and the Republican: Frederick Douglass, Abraham Lincoln, and the Triumph of Antislavery Politics. New York: W.W. Norton & Company, Inc. 2007.

External links

 Frederick Douglass's Descendants Deliver His 'Fourth of July' Speech (video)
First edition of the publication of Douglass's speech
Discussion of the pamphlet from The Public Domain Review
 

Speeches by Frederick Douglass
1852 speeches
Slavery in the United States
History of Rochester, New York
Independence Day (United States)
1852 in New York (state)
Abolitionism in the United States